The Plastic Man Comedy/Adventure Show is an animated television series produced by Ruby-Spears Productions from 1979 to 1981; it was shown right after Super Friends on the ABC Network.

The show featured various adventures of the DC Comics superhero Plastic Man. The anthology show included several components, including Plastic Man, Baby Plas, Plastic Family, Mighty Man and Yukk, Fangface and Fangpuss, and Rickety Rocket.

By January 1980, it was cut down to 90 minutes, dropping off Rickety Rocket, amidst low ratings. By the 1980-81 season, this was changed and it was retooled into The Plasticman/Baby Plas Super Comedy and paired it up with two other Ruby-Spears productions Thundarr the Barbarian and Heathcliff and Dingbat. The show was repackaged by Arlington Television into 130 half-hour episodes, and released into national, first-run-off-network daily syndication in 1984. The Plastic Man Comedy Show was produced and directed by Steve Whiting and featured a live-action "Plastic Man", played by Taylor Marks.

Premise
The origin of Plastic Man is never expressly stated on this series, but it is implied he was originally the small-time crook Patrick "Eel" O'Brian who reformed after he was left for dead by the mob and gained plastic stretch powers. Plastic Man, his girlfriend Penny, and his Polynesian sidekick Hula-Hula travel the world and are given their assignments from the Chief to stop any threat to the world. Plastic Man often retains his sense of humor even in dangerous situations, such as a giant octopus capturing Penny and Hula-Hula causing him to ask "What scout troop did he belong to?"

Only Plastic Man villains Doctor Dome, Doctor Honctoff, Carrot-Man and Spider came from the comics while every other villain was created for the series. The series has a regular consumer affairs public service announcement that presents simple consumer advice for viewers, such as shopping around various retailers for the best price, or going to the public library to see if a desired book is available to borrow instead of buying it.

In early episodes Penny has a crush on Plastic Man, who chooses to ignore it as he himself has a crush on the dark-haired female Chief. However, in the second season Plastic Man reciprocates Penny's crush on him and the two marry. The marriage produces a son who has the same powers as Plastic Man and spawns a lighter series of episodes featuring Baby Plas doing things such as saving his friends from neighborhood bullies.

Segments
Besides Plastic Man, Baby Plas, and the Plastic Family, the rest of the original lineup in the first season consists of:

 Mighty Man and Yukk - The adventures of a tiny superhero (voiced by Peter Cullen) and his talking dog sidekick (voiced by Frank Welker) who wears a doghouse-helmet because he is so ugly that he can destroy practically anything just by looking at it. The two of them protect their city from various villains when called in by the unnamed Mayor (voiced by John Stephenson).
 Fangface and Fangpuss - This second season of Fangface is about a reluctant werewolf (voiced by Frank Welker) and his baby cousin (also voiced by Frank Welker) who also turns into a werewolf and their adventures with Fangfaces friends Biff (voiced by Jerry Dexter), Kim (voiced by Susan Blu), and Puggsy (voiced by Bart Braverman).
 Rickety Rocket - An artificially intelligent rocket (voiced by Al Fann) was created by a group of African-American kid geniuses consisting of Sunstroke (voiced by John Anthony Bailey), Splashdown (voiced by Johnny Brown), Cosmo (voiced by Bobby F. Ellerby), and Venus (voiced by Dee Timberlake). They solve mysteries in the future, in the vein of Speed Buggy.

By its second season, it was cut down to 90 minutes and everything except Plastic Man and Baby Plas replaced by three new segments in the lineup:

 Heathcliff
 Dingbat and the Creeps
 Thundarr the Barbarian

Production
The first episode of The Plastic Man Comedy/Adventure Show to air was "Louse of Wax", which was broadcast only once, as part of ABC's Saturday morning preview special for 1979. The episode was written by Mark Evanier, who recalled that "it was one of the fastest cartoon shows ever produced for television. I think from the time I wrote the script to the time it aired was about six weeks. We had finished production on Plastic Man for the time being. I got called in and I was told, 'We need to write another episode of Plastic Man and you're the fastest writer we've got.'" The plot was taken from an unused outline Evanier had written for the series. "Louse of Wax" used a different opening sequence from the one used in the rest of the series; according to Evanier, this was because the series opening had not yet been finished, so a different one had to be created to have the preview special ready in time.

Cast
For each of the shows, the cast list is the same. Taylor Marks (a pseudonym of stand-up comedian Mark Taylor) played Plastic Man in the program's live action segments in syndication.

 John Anthony Bailey as Sunstroke
 Joe Baker as Hula-Hula, Professor Friday
 Michael Bell as Plastic Man, Dr. Astro, Marak, Junior Macintosh, Half-Ape (2nd Time), Gearshift Swift, Krime Klown, Nefario
 Susan Blu as Kim, Sally Jones
 Bart Braverman as Puggsy
 Melendy Britt as Chief, Penny
 Johnny Brown as Splashdown
 Peter Cullen as Brandon Brewster/Mighty Man
 Jerry Dexter as Biff
 Bobby F. Ellerbee as Cosmo
 Al Fann as Rickety Rocket
 Clare Peck as Baby Plas
 Michael Rye as Main Title Narrator, Dr. Lazarus Web, Skullman
 John Stephenson as Mayor, Fangface Narrator, Weed, Royal Rajah, Computerhead (2nd Time), Anthead, Big Mouse, Magnet Man, Catman, Dr. Rufus T. Gadgets, Marble Man, Mr. Van Pire, Dr. Decay, Dr. Lash, Ironmask
 Dee Timberlake as Venus
 Frank Welker as Sherman Fangsworth/Fangface, Baby Fangs/Fangpuss, Yukk

Note: John Stephenson is listed twice in the credits.

Staff
 Story editors: Mark Jones, Elana Lesser, Cliff Ruby
 Story: Mark Jones, Elana Lesser, Cliff Ruby, Mark Evanier, Gary Greenfield, Michael Maurer, Jon Kubichan, Steve Gerber, Norman Maurer, Sid Morse, Buzz Dixon, Jeffrey Scott, Ted Pedersen, Chris Vane, Gordon Kent, Shelly Stark, Roy Thomas, Larry Alexander, Larry Parr, Creighton Barnes
 Directors: Rudy Larriva, Manny Perez, Charles A. Nichols

Episodes

Plastic Man
 "The Weed" (09/22/1979) – Plastic Man takes on the Weed, a walking sentient plant who robs a university of its plant growth formula in order to create his own plant monster in order to destroy the world's capitals, starting with Lima, Peru, unless an astronomical sum of money is ransomed to him. The Weed fails to realize his mutated plant monster may not behave like other plants.
 "Dr. Irwin and Mr. Meteor" (09/22/1979) – The puny Dr. Irwin Feldspar finds a meteor that transforms him into the powerful Mr. Meteor giving him a Jekyll and Hyde personality. Mr. Meteor is too much even for Plastic Man, but Penny might become a big help.
 "Wham-Bam! Beware of the Clam!" (09/29/1979) – A sentient clam with a pirate captain-motif, called "The Clam" steals a water-controlling machine from the Chinese government. The Chief tells Plastic Man the machine is in Italy, however, that was a false report by the Clam's hoods, leaving New York City undefended for the Clam to make a tsunami, evacuating NYC and flooding it completely except for the top floors of the tallest buildings, allowing the Clam and his underlings to commit robberies as all the banks and department stores are now submerged.
 "The Day the Ocean Disappeared" (09/29/1979) – Dr. Honctoff is stealing all of the oceans and seas around the world by using a secret formula to turn them into vapour and then bottling them. Plastic Man is called into stop Honctoff's dastardly deeds.
 "The Horrible Half-Ape" (10/06/1979) – While working on a secret government project, Professor Darwin's experiment goes very wrong. The mistake is costly as it leaves Professor Darwin (quite literally) half ape and half human. As Half-Ape, he plans to steal a visiting flying saucer to start an interplanetary war.
 "Hugefoot" (10/06/1979) - Hugefoot steals a device that can make people see into the future and even makes off with Penny.
 "The Miniscule 7" (10/13/1979) – A group of small gangsters called the Miniscule 7 plot to win basketball tournaments their way. It's up to Plastic Man to stop them.
 "Moonraider" (10/13/1979) – Moonraider is stealing NASA's spaceships in outer space.
 "Superstein" (10/20/1979) – Dr. Superstein plots to steal the minds of people to power his monster army.
 "Dogmaster" (10/20/1979) – Dogmaster plans to steal the formula for a power ray that has been hidden in a chimpanzee's brain.
 "The Diabolical Doctor Dome" (10/27/1979) – Doctor Dome discovers a way to extract Plastic Man's superpowers and uses them to commit crimes.
 "Honey Bee" (10/27/1979) – Honey Bee plans to use a heat missile to turn the world into a 'hot house' so that only she and her insects will survive.
 "The Dangerous Doctor Dinosaur" (11/03/1979) – Doctor Dinosaur uses his dinosaurs to help rob banks and national landmarks.
 "The Spider Takes A Bride" (11/03/1979) – One by one, the Spider starts to turn Queen Katherine's follower's into flies until she decides to marry him.
 "Empire of Evil" (11/10/1979) – An airplane carrying the children of an important official crashes in the forbidden zone of Stone Island, which is run by a sinister group known as the Empire of Evil. Plastic Man and his friends are sent to rescue the children and return them to safety.
 "The Corruptible Carrot-Man" (11/10/1979) – When Carrot-Man steals a map that will lead him to a cosmic scepter, Plastic Man must stop Carrot Man from getting to it.
 "The Maniacal Computerhead" (11/17/1979) – Computerhead is an evil robot that has developed a device that can bring any machine to life. He then sets out to create an army of machines to take over the world.
 "The Hippotist" (11/17/1979) – Hippotist is hypnotizing bank managers to rob their own banks and return the stolen loot to him.
 "Badladdin" (11/24/1979) – Plastic Man must make a plan to stop an evil genie that is abducting teenagers at an alarming rate. The genie grants wishes to teenagers that want to win. He then turns them into a statue of gold and takes them for his collection, and his next target is Penny's nephew who is in a track & field competition. Plastic-Man had once fought Badladdin before, and the villain is determined not to lose a rematch.
 "Toyman" (11/24/1979) – Toyman is kidnapping famous people everywhere and is turning them into toys. Unfortunately for Plastic Man, he is the last person on Toyman's list to abduct.
 "Ghostfinger" (12/01/1979) – Plastic Man learns that Ghost Finger has returned to get revenge on the people responsible for sending him to prison. He uses a time machine to bring other evil ghost from the past in to help him get his revenge.
 "Highbrow" (12/01/1979) – Highbrow steals the world's most famous trains so that people will have to pay him to travel on them.
 "The Kitty Katt Caper" (12/08/1979) – Kitty Katt discovers an Egyptian serum that can turn anyone into cats.
 "The Colossal Crime Of Commodore Peril" (12/08/1979) – Commodore Peril holds the prized possessions belonging to three billionaires for ransom.
 "The Terrible 5 + 1" (12/15/1979) – Solex uses his solar weapon to spring Weed, Half-Ape, Clam, Computerhead, and Disco Mummy from prison in order to lead them. However, they don't agree with his terms. When Solex starts disrupting their crimes, the five villains turn to Plastic Man for help.
 "Joggernaut" (12/15/1979) – Joggernaught plans to steal an energy machine in order to use it to find the treasure of the Amazon City of Gold.
 "Doctor Duplicator Strikes Again" (12/22/1979) – Doctor Duplicator is kidnapping politicians and replacing them with evil duplicate clones in order to steal government secrets.
 "Thunderman" (12/22/1979) – Thunderman has stolen New York City and plans to sell it to the highest bidder.
 "Count Graffiti Meets Plastic Man" (01/05/1980) – Count Graffiti wants revenge on the Royal Family of Ocentania after being exiled from the country. He plans on stealing the royal crown in order to make himself the new king, but Plastic Man has other ideas and plans on stopping his scheme.
 "Sale of the Century" (01/05/1980) – Desperate for a sale, Gearshift Swift sells Earth to passing aliens. Now Plastic Man must save Earth from being pulled from its orbit by the aliens.
 "Plastic Mummy Meets Disco Mummy" (01/12/1980) – An ancient Aztec Queen called Disco Mummy comes back to life and steals the ancient treasure of Cortez from the government of Mexico. She tricks Plastic Man into helping her and then turns him into a mummy. He must find a way out if he is to have a chance to stop her.
 "City of Ice" (01/12/1980) – The elderly Dr. Frost finds the city of ice and in it the power of eternal youth. After learning its secret, she plans on reversing the gases effect and use it on the world. Plastic Man has to stop her evil scheme to turn the world's population into old people.
 "Plastic Man Meets Plastic Ape" (09/20/1980) – Dr. Astro has created a giant plastic ape and is using it to ransack New York. Plastic Man is called in to thwart his evil schemes.
 "The Crime Costume Caper" (09/27/1980) – Greta Grim has designed the ultimate hi-tech villain suit. In order to sell it to every criminal in the world, she films a commercial starring none other than Plastic Man.
 "The Royal Gargoyle Foil" (10/04/1980) – The evil Gargoyle is bent on stealing Doctor Ventor's invisible ray machine. Luckily, Plastic Man stumbles across the plan and decides to prevent the Gargoyles' scheme.

Plastic Family
 "Presenting Baby Plas" – Baby Plas ends up becoming the star of a circus performance.
 "The Abominable Snow Sport" –
 "Baby Plas' Finny Friend" –
 "The Big, Big Crush" –
 "Ali Baba Baby" –
 "Mighty Museum Mess" –
 "Rustlin' Rascals" –
 "Calamity Cruise" –
 "Who Undo The Zoo" –
 "Ozark Family Feud" –
 "Dr. Strangeleaf" –
 "Kewpie Doll Caper" –
 "Rodeo Ruckus" –

Baby Plas
 "Bad Luck Stroll" – Hula-Hula goes out to get some eggs and Baby Plas has to keep him from getting in trouble.
 "Baseball Bully" –
 "Haircut Headache" –
 "Witchin' Worries" – A witch tries to get Baby Plas in her cauldron to complete a spell.
 "Tiger Trouble" –
 "Clubhouse Calamity" –
 "Babysitter Blues" – When a babysitter watches over Baby Plas, things get bad when she won't let him watch his favorite show.
 "Sleepwalking Snafu" –
 "Birthday Blowout" – Baby Plas has to beat his enemy at some party games.
 "Movie Mischief" – When the Plastic Family goes to the movies, Baby Plas has to get food for himself and his parents..and watch out for a hungry dog!
 "Tropical Trouble" –
 "Frognapped" –
 "Mummy Madness" – Baby Plas accidentally awakens a mummy at the museum and it goes after him.

Mighty Man and Yukk
 "Big Mouse the Bad Mouse" (9/22/1979) – Bad Mouse and his rodent followers steal the city mint.
 "Magnet Man" (9/22/1979) – Magnet Man threatens to use his giant magnet to pull the city into the river unless he is paid a very big ransom.
 "Anthead" (9/29/1979) – To pull off the crime of the century, Anthead steals computers to help him plan one.
 "Never Retire with Mr. & Mrs. Van Pire" (9/29/1979) – Mr. and Mrs. Van Pire are hypnotizing millionaires to sell them their fortunes and then turning them into bats.
 "Goldteeth's Bad Bite" (10/6/1979) – Goldteeth and his sidekick Doctor Decay plan to steal a gold plated satellite that is orbiting outer space.
 "Baby Man" (10/6/1979) – Baby Man and his nanny henchwomen are making City officials act like babies by spraying them with a secret formula.
 "Trouble Brews When Glue Man Glues" (10/13/1979) – Sick of being beaten by Mighty Man and Yukk, the villainous Glue Man hatches a plan to steal chemicals that will create a formula to turn himself into Super-Glue Man upon obtaining a scientist named Dr. Stickol to perform the procedure.
 "Shake Up with Ms. Make-Up" (10/13/1979) – Miss Make-Up, the most beautiful criminal that ever lived, plans to steal a scroll that contains Cleopatra's beauty secrets.
 "Bad News Snooze" (10/20/1979) – Madame Sleep and her henchmen Lazy and Tired steal King Ledus' ring. She plans to use the ring which is a key to unlock the vault at the Lagovian Embassy, steal the Lagovian Lion Statue and hold it for a ransom of $10,000,000,000.
 "Coach Crime's Big Play" (10/20/1979) – To infiltrate Coach Crime's gang of thieves and figure out who his real identity is, Mighty Man and Yukk pose as safecrackers.
 "Public Rooster #1" (10/27/1979) – The Rooster steals an anti-gravity machine which he uses to commit numerous dastardly crimes in order to make himself Public Enemy #1.
 "Rob Around the Clock" (10/27/1979) – The Time Keeper and his henchmen Minute Man and Second Hand Rose are freezing time. They then commit crimes resulting in an unstoppable crime spree.
 "The Perils of Paulette" (11/3/1979) – The maniacal Handhead tries to force a movie studio to replace their actress Paulette with his girlfriend Billie by sabotaging their latest movie.
 "The Dangerous Dr. Gadgets" (11/3/1979) – In a plot to discredit Mighty Man and Yukk, Dr. Rufus T. Gadgets sets up his own crimes so that he can be the hero of the city.
 "Bye Bye Biplane" (11/10/1979) – Baron Brute steals an amnesia machine and plans to use it to win a space shuttle contract by sabotaging his opponent.
 "Beach Bum's Crime Wave" (11/10/1979) – Mighty Man and Yukk encounter Beach Bum, a villain who uses his surfing talents and advanced technology to steal anything valuable including King Neptune's golden trident.
 "The Fiendish Fishface" (11/17/1979) – Fishface uses his trained dolphins to capture millionaires on their yachts and has his henchmen disguise themselves as them.
 "Catman" (11/17/1979) – A cat burglar named Catman uses his trained his pet lion and black panther to steal the world's largest diamond.
 "Kragg the Conqueror" (11/24/1979) – A scientist named Dr. Lash thaws out a Viking warrior named Kragg the Conqueror and his hound. He then plans to use them to abduct the mayor, the police chief, and Mighty Man.
 "The Menacing Mindreader" (11/24/1979) – Miro The Mentalist uses a mindreading machine that enables him to steal valuable information from the brains of his victims.
 "Dog Gone Days" (12/1/1979) – Fed up with guard dogs spoiling his crimes, a small-time criminal becomes the Dogcatcher, luring and capturing dogs with a sonic whistle so he can eliminate every dog on Earth, including Yukk.
 "The Evil Evo-Ray" (12/1/1979) – Future Man, a fully evolved human with futuristic powers, plans to turn the whole of mankind into cavemen.
 "The Video Villain" (12/8/1979) – Camera Man uses his 3-D camera to travel through any television in the city and commit robberies.
 "Krime Klown's Circus of Evil" (12/8/1979) – Krime Klown uses his Krime Kazoo to turn the citizens into his circus henchmen.
 "Copycat" (12/15/1979) – Copycat and his henchman Ivan plot to steal the fortune and money belt of oil tycoon Bucks Galore.
 "The Sinister Super Suit" (12/15/1979) – Former TV villain Nefario creates a super suit which enables him to stay one step ahead of Mighty Man and Yukk while he is committing a series of crimes.
 "The Malevolent Marble Man" (12/22/1979) – Marble Man uses a device to bring statues to life in a plot to drive out the citizens and claim the city for themselves.
 "Evil Notions with Evila's Potions" (12/22/1979) – Evila the Witch enchants the city's gems into following her back to her house.
 "The Diabolical Dr. Locust" (12/29/1979) – Dr. Locust attempts to steal three ancient Chinese junks that once combined creates a robotic warrior.
 "Where There's a Will, There's a Creep" (12/29/1979) – Stanley Johnson is set to inherit a fortune if he spends the night in a haunted house. The only problem is the Creep and his henchman Clyde plan to kidnap Stanley so that the Creep inherits the money himself.
 "Doctor Icicle" (1/5/1980) – Doctor Icicle and his sidekick Frosty are kidnapping renowned scientists in order to build a super freezing machine that will freeze the sun.
 "The Glutunous Glop" (1/5/1980) – An evil professor named Sanfon Vulch creates Glop, a monster that can eat its way through anything. Glop is sent to Brandon Brewster's house to eat through his safe and steal a set of valuable blueprints.

Fangface and Fangpuss

Rickety Rocket

Home media
On October 20, 2009, Warner Home Video (via DC Entertainment, Hanna-Barbera and Warner Bros. Family Entertainment) released The Plastic Man Comedy/Adventure Show: The Complete Collection, featuring the 35 Plastic Man cartoons on DVD in Region 1. Contrary to the title, the Baby Plas, Plastic Family, Live-action intro segments, and other segments from Season 1 were not included and have yet to be officially released. The "Louse of Wax" episode was also omitted from the collection. The pitch and speed that were presented in the R1 Complete Collection DVD set were the international PAL versions, due to expensive costing issues when about to use and remaster the original NTSC film elements, with correct speed and pitch.

References

External links
 
 Big Cartoon Database

1979 American television series debuts
1981 American television series endings
1970s American animated television series
1980s American animated television series
1970s American anthology television series
1980s American anthology television series
American Broadcasting Company original programming
Animated television shows based on DC Comics
Ruby-Spears superheroes
Television series by Ruby-Spears
English-language television shows
American animated television spin-offs
American television series with live action and animation
American children's animated action television series
American children's animated adventure television series
American children's animated anthology television series
American children's animated superhero television series
Television series created by Joe Ruby
Television series created by Ken Spears